Seibu may refer to:
Seibu Holdings or a subsidiary thereof
Saitama Seibu Lions
Seibu Railway
Sogo & Seibu
Seibu Department Stores, owned by Sogo & Seibu
Seibu Kaihatsu